Boudabousia marimammalium is a bacterium from the genus of Boudabousia.

References

Actinomycetales
Bacteria described in 2001